Arboussols is a commune in the Pyrénées-Orientales department in southern France.

Geography

Localisation 
Arboussols is located in the canton of La Vallée de l'Agly and in the arrondissement of Prades.

Government and politics

Mayors

Population

Sites of interest 
 The church of Saint Saviour in Arboussols ;
 The church of Saint Eulalia in Arboussols ;
 The medieval hamlet of Marcevol ;
 The priory of Marcevol ;
 The church of Our Lady of the Stairs in Marcevol ;
 The half-dolmen de la Llosa del Cortal dels Polls.

See also
Communes of the Pyrénées-Orientales department

References

Communes of Pyrénées-Orientales